Ich hör auf mein Herz (English: I Listen to My Heart) is the sixth studio album by Austrian recording artist Christina Stürmer. It was released by Polydor Records on 19 April 2013 in German-speaking Europe.

Track listing

Charts

Weekly charts

Year-end charts

Certifications

References

External links 
 

Christina Stürmer albums
2013 albums
Polydor Records albums
German-language albums